Yasuo Akizuki (23 August 1902 – 11 July 1984) was a Japanese mathematician. He was a professor at Kyoto University.

Life 
Yasuo Akizuki was born on 23 August 1902 in Wakayama.
In 1926, Akizuki graduated Faculty of Mathematics, Department of Science, Kyoto Imperial University.

He was inaugurated as a professor of Kyoto University in 1948.

References 

Japanese mathematicians
1902 births
1984 deaths
Academic staff of Kyoto University